The Aldobrandeschi were an Italian noble family from southern Tuscany.

Overview
Of probable Lombard origin, they appear in history as counts in the 9th century. The first known count was Hildebrand II (857). Their possession extended to what is now southern Tuscany and northern Lazio regions of Italy.

In 1274, their lands were divided between the County of Santa Fiora and the County of Sovana, which thenceforth were ruled by different branches of the family. After the extinction of the Aldobrandeschi of Sovana, the county was assigned to the Orsini. The Aldobrandeschi heiress of Santa Fiora married into the Sforza family.

The most famous members were: Guglielmo Aldobrandeschi, who lived in the 13th century and is cited by Dante Alighieri as the Gran Tosco ("Grand Tuscan"); Guglielmo's son is also cited in Canto XI of the Purgatorio in the Divine Comedy as an example of a sinner of pride; and Margherita, the last of the Aldobrandeschi of Sovana, who married Guy de Montfort, Count of Nola, and passed rule over Soana to her daughter Anastasia and son-in-law, Romano "Romanello" Orsini and their heirs.

See also 

 Republic of Siena
 Pitigliano
 Sovana
 County of Santa Fiora

Notes

External links

Italian noble families
Lombard families